Letters from the Park is a 1988 Cuban drama film directed by Tomás Gutiérrez Alea. The film was selected as the Cuban entry for the Best Foreign Language Film at the 61st Academy Awards, but was not accepted as a nominee.

Cast
 Víctor Laplace
 Ivonne López Arenal
 Miguel Paneke
 Mirta Ibarra
 Adolfo Llauradó
 Elio Mesa

See also
 List of submissions to the 61st Academy Awards for Best Foreign Language Film
 List of Cuban submissions for the Academy Award for Best Foreign Language Film

References

External links
 

1988 films
1988 drama films
Cuban drama films
1980s Spanish-language films
Films directed by Tomás Gutiérrez Alea